Ted Vasin (born April 11, 1966) is an American artist who works in painting and sound. His work addresses the phenomenon of the psychological spectrum and its possibilities of expansion and transcendence. He is based in San Francisco.

Biography 
Born April 11, 1966 in Moscow, Russia. He studied at Moscow Art College and graduated in 1986, before relocating to the United States in the 1990s.

Vasin has exhibited for nearly two decades both internationally and statewide including shows at the 101/exhibit, Limm Art Gallery, Davis Art Center, artMRKT Hamptons, Frey Norris Gallery, Sotheby’s in New York, Tel Aviv and Amsterdam, Stanford Art Spaces, and more.

He was an artist-in-residence at the Fine Arts Museums of San Francisco, exhibiting at the California Palace of the Legion of Honor and the De Young Art Center. In 2006 Vasin was a recipient of the Pollock-Krasner Foundation Grant.

His work has been reviewed by the ArtWeek, San Francisco Chronicle, ArtSlant and has been featured in Hi-Fructose Magazine, American Art Collector, New American Paintings, Wired magazine, as well as online in Juxtapoz, and Beautiful/Decay.

References

External links
 Ted Vasin music profile on Last.fm

1966 births
Living people
20th-century American painters
20th-century American male artists
American male painters
21st-century American painters
20th-century Russian painters
Russian male painters
21st-century Russian painters
Artists from San Francisco
Psychedelic artists
20th-century Russian male artists
21st-century Russian male artists